The 2015–16 Louisiana Tech Lady Techsters basketball team represented Louisiana Tech University during the 2015–16 NCAA Division I women's basketball season. The Lady Techsters, led by head coach Tyler Summitt, played their home games at Thomas Assembly Center and were members of Conference USA. They finished the season 14–16, 9–9 in C-USA play to finish in a tie for seventh place. They lost in the first round of the C-USA women's tournament to Rice.

On April 7, 2016, Summitt resigned from Louisiana Tech for personal reasons citing "engaging in a relationship that has negatively affected the people I love, respect and care about the most." He finished at Louisiana Tech with a 2 year record of 30–31.

Roster

Schedule

|-
!colspan=9 style="background:#75B2DD; color:white;"| Exhibition

|-
!colspan=9 style="background:#75B2DD; color:white;"| Non-conference regular season

|-
!colspan=9 style="background:#75B2DD; color:white;"| Conference USA regular season

|-
!colspan=9 style="background:#75B2DD; color:white;"| Conference USA Women's Tournament

See also
2015–16 Louisiana Tech Bulldogs basketball team

References

Louisiana Tech Lady Techsters basketball seasons
Louisiana Tech
Louis
Louis